Kolpashevo Airport  is an airport in Russia located 3 km northeast of Kolpashevo.  It is a civilian airfield with a simple utilitarian paved layout and 500 x 50 meter tarmac.

Airports built in the Soviet Union
Airports in Tomsk Oblast